Alfred's Castle is a small Iron Age hill fort, situated at , behind Ashdown Park in the civil parish of Ashbury in Oxfordshire (formerly Berkshire). It lies 2–3 km south of the Ridgeway and is protected as a Scheduled Ancient Monument.

It has a large enclosure attached that shows as a cropmark. Excavation has shown this to be contemporary with the small enclosure, started in the 6th century BC. The hill fort was established within a series of late Bronze Age linear ditches and revealed much evidence for occupation within it. In the late 1st century, a Romano-British farmhouse was built within the abandoned prehistoric enclosure.

King Alfred won a great victory against the Danes at the Battle of Ashdown, in AD 871. Being located just to the west of Ashdown House, Victorian antiquaries associated Alfred's Castle with the King's troop movements before the battle. The exact site of Alfred's battle has not yet been determined, however, so is a matter for debate. The most likely sites are near Compton and Aldworth in Berkshire.

Excavations were carried out at Alfred's Castle from 1998 to 2000 by archaeologists from Oxford University.  A final analysis was published in 2014.

See also
List of hillforts in England
List of hillforts in Scotland
List of hillforts in Wales

References

Further reading

External links 

 Interim report – https://web.archive.org/save/http://projects.arch.ox.ac.uk/HOR1.html

Hill forts in Oxfordshire
Roman villas in Oxfordshire
Tourist attractions in Oxfordshire
Scheduled monuments in Oxfordshire
Former populated places in Oxfordshire